Dirkie is a given name. Notable people with the name include:

Dirkie Binneman (1918–1959), South African cyclist
Dirkie Chamberlain (born 1986), South African field hockey player
Dirkie Uys (1823–1838), South African trekker
Dirkie, the original name of the 1969 South African film Lost in the Desert